Raul Aguilera Jr. (born August 2, 1999) is an American professional soccer player who plays as a midfielder.

Career

Youth 
Aguilera started his prep career at Seminole High School. He was a 2015 NSCAA Youth Boys All-America selection and was ranked No. 42 nationally by TopDrawerSoccer.com as a college recruit. Playing as part of the Orlando City Development Academy, he earned all-conference honors in the Under-15/16 Eastern Conference in 2016.

College 
Aguilera played three seasons of college soccer at the University of North Carolina at Chapel Hill between 2017 and 2019, making 43 appearances, scoring 2 goals and tallying 6 assists for the Tar Heels.

In his sophomore year at college, Aguilera also played in the USL PDL with SIMA Águilas.

Orlando City 
In March 2020, Aguilera returned to Orlando to sign a professional contract with USL League One side Orlando City B ahead of the 2020 season. He made his debut on August 7, 2020, appearing as a 78th-minute substitute during a 2–0 win over New England Revolution II.

In April 2021, Aguilera signed as a homegrown with the Orlando City first-team on a one-year contract with three option years. Aguilera had his contract option declined at the end of the 2021 season.

Indy Eleven 
Aguilera joined Indy Eleven of the USL Championship on January 13, 2022. He left Indy Eleven following their 2022 season.

Personal life
Aguilera is the son of Raul Aguilera Sr, a Mexican soccer player who played one season for Orlando Sundogs in the USISL A-League in 1997. While at college, Aguilera studied exercise and sports science.

References

External links 
 Raul Aguilera Tar Heels bio
 Raul Aguilera at Orlando City
 

1999 births
American soccer players
Association football midfielders
Homegrown Players (MLS)
Living people
North Carolina Tar Heels men's soccer players
Orlando City B players
Orlando City SC players
SIMA Águilas players
Soccer players from Orlando, Florida
Sportspeople from Sanford, Florida
USL League One players
USL League Two players
Major League Soccer players
United States men's youth international soccer players
Indy Eleven players